Victor Roşca who was appointed on July 4, 2001 left the team in February 2002. Few days later, Lăcătuş was appointed as the new manager.

Competitions

Friendlies

Divizia A

League table

Results by round

Results summary

Matches

Cupa României

Players

Transfers

In

Out

See also

 2001–02 Divizia A
 2001–02 Cupa României

References

ASC Oțelul Galați seasons
Oțelul, Galați, ACS